MV Cape Don is a former lighthouse tender, now a museum ship and training ship in Waverton, New South Wales, Australia.

Built and launched by the State Dockyard at Newcastle, New South Wales in 1962 for the Commonwealth Lighthouse Service, she serviced the lighthouses, lightships and buoys of the Australian coast from 1963 to the early 1990s. She is being restored  by the labour of enthusiasts to become a museum and training ship. She is listed on the Australian Register of Historic Vessels. She is currently berthed at the former coal loading wharf in Balls Head Bay, Waverton, New South Wales. As of 2022 the restoration project is proceeding well.

On October 10th 2022 TAFE courses started onboard.

Service history
In 1973, the Cape Don assisted in the recovery of two anchors which were jettisoned in 1803 from  whilst under the command of Matthew Flinders. In 1987 she transported the tower of the former lighthouse from the Neptune Islands to Port Adelaide for inclusion in the collection of the South Australian Maritime Museum.

See also
 State Dockyard
 HMS Investigator Anchors

References

External links
 The MV Cape Don Society

 

1962 ships
Lighthouse tenders of Australia
Transport museums in New South Wales
Museum ships in Australia